Ancistrobasis zumbii is a species of extremely small deep water sea snail, a marine gastropod mollusk in the family Seguenziidae.

Distribution
This species occurs in deep water in the Atlantic Ocean off Brazil.

References

External links
 To World Register of Marine Species

zumbii
Gastropods described in 2013